Wolica Nowa  is a village in west-central Poland, located in the administrative district of Gmina Nowe Miasto nad Wartą, within Środa Wielkopolska County, Greater Poland Voivodeship.

References

Wolica Nowa